Godrej Group is an Indian multinational conglomerate headquartered in Mumbai, which is managed and largely owned by the Godrej family. It was founded by Ardeshir Godrej and Pirojsha Burjorji Godrej in 1897, and operates in sectors including real estate, consumer products, industrial engineering, appliances, furniture, security and agricultural products. Its subsidiaries and affiliated companies include Godrej Industries and its subsidiaries Godrej Consumer Products, Godrej Agrovet, and Godrej Properties, as well as the private holding company Godrej & Boyce Mfg. Co. Ltd.;

Timeline
 1897: Godrej was established in 1897
 1897: Godrej introduced the first lock with lever technology in India.
 1902: Godrej makes its first Indian Safe
 1918: Godrej Soaps Limited incorporated
 1920: Godrej made soap using vegetable oil, which was a huge hit with the vegetarian community in India
 1955: Godrej produced India's first indigenous typewriter
 1961: Godrej Started Manufacturing Forklift Trucks in India
 1971: Godrej Agrovet Limited began as an Animal Feeds division of Godrej Soaps
 1974: Veg oils division in Wadala, Mumbai acquired
 1988: Godrej Properties Limited, another subsidiary, established
 1989: Godrej became the first Indian company to introduce PUF (polyurethane foam) 
 1991: Foods business started
 1994: Transelektra Domestic Products acquired
 1995: Transelektra forged a strategic alliance with Sara Lee USA
 1999: Transelektra renamed Godrej Sara Lee Limited and incorporated Godrej Infotech Ltd.
 2001: Godrej Consumer Products was formed as a result of the demerger of Godrej Soaps Limited. Godrej Soaps renamed Godrej Industries Limited
 2002: Godrej Tea Limited set up
 2003: Entered the BPO solutions and services space with Godrej Global Solutions Limited
 2004: Godrej HiCare Limited set up to provide a Safe Healthy Environment to customers by providing professional pest management services
 2006: Foods business was merged with Godrej Tea and Godrej Tea renamed Godrej Beverages & Foods Limited
 2007: Godrej Beverages & Foods Limited formed a JV with The Hershey Company of North America and the company was renamed Godrej Hershey Foods & Beverages Limited
 2008: Godrej relaunched itself with new colourful logo and a fresh identity music
 2010: Godrej launched GoJiyo a free, browser based 3D virtual world
 2011: Godrej & Boyce shuts down its typewriter manufacturing plant, the last in the world.
 2014: Godrej kick-starts Masterbrand 2.0 – bigger & brighter; Launches FreeG; India's first non-web based mobile browsing experience, 18 November 2014 
 2020: The Godrej Group enters into financial services business with Godrej Housing Finance (GHF) to provide affordable Home loans

Operations 

The Godrej group can be broadly divided into two major holding companies, working independently:
 Godrej Industries Ltd
 Godrej & Boyce

References

External links

Godrej Palm Retreat
Godrej Woods
Godrej Palm Retreat

 
Manufacturing companies of India
Companies based in Mumbai
Conglomerate companies established in 1897
Conglomerate companies of India
Indian brands
Indian companies established in 1897